Birthday is The Association's fourth album. The album featured two hit singles, "Everything That Touches You", which hit number 10 in the charts, and "Time for Livin, which reached number 39. This was the last LP by the group that spawned Top 40 hits. It peaked at number 23 in the Billboard charts.

MacArthur Park 
The song "MacArthur Park", which was first recorded by Richard Harris, was originally offered to the Association for inclusion on this album. Producer Bones Howes challenged Jimmy Webb to write a pop song that incorporated classical instrumentation and an odd time signature, which he planned to have the Association record.

According to rumors, the song was intended as a centerpiece for a twenty-four-minute cantata that would occupy one side of the record, but the group rejected the idea and were only interested (albeit reluctantly) in recording the “MacArthur Park” section. This rumor was later debunked by Webb himself, claiming there was only one composition. The reason for its exclusion was that the group, being able songwriters themselves, were not willing to give up two to three of their songs for the sake of Webb's project.

When Harris, who had just performed a slew of musical numbers for the film adaptation of Camelot, contacted Webb for a possible collaboration, this was among the compositions that were in consideration. The Harris recording became lead single for his pop record debut, A Tramp Shining, and made its way onto the Billboard Hot 100 at number 79 on May 11, 1968, peaking at number 2 on June 22, 1968 behind Herb Alpert's "This Guy's in Love with You".

Track listing

Singles 
"Everything That Touches You" b/w "We Love Us" (Warner Bros. 7163) January 8, 1968 (US #10)
"Time for Livin b/w "Birthday Morning" (Warner Bros. 7195) April 24, 1968 (US #39)

Personnel

The Association
 Terry Kirkman – wind instruments, vocals, percussion
 Larry Ramos – lead guitar, vocals
 Russ Giguere – rhythm guitar, vocals, percussion
 Brian Cole – bass, vocals, woodwinds
 Ted Bluechel, Jr. – drums, vocals, rhythm guitar, bass
 Jim Yester – rhythm guitar, vocals, keyboards

Additional musicians
According to the 2010 deluxe mono edition:

 Hal Blaine – drums
 Joe Osborn, Ray Pohlman – bass
 Jim Yester, Tommy Tedesco, Russ Giguere, David Bennett Cohen, Mike Deasy, Dennis Budimir, Al Casey – guitars
 Larry Knechtel – piano, keyboards
 Milton Holland, Dale Anderson, Gene Estes, Larry Bunker – vibes, various percussion
 Red Callender – double bass, tuba
 James Decker, Arthur Maebe, William Hinshaw, David Duke – French horn
 Emanuel Klein, Jimmy Zito, Buddy Childers, Tony Terran, Bobby Bryant – trumpet
 Lew McCreary, David Wells – trombone
 James Decker, William Hinshaw – French horn
 John Johnson – saxophone
 Paulo Alencar, Arnold Belnick, Henry Ferber, Jacques Gasselin, Jerome Reisler, Ralph Schaeffer, Sidney Sharp, William Weiss, Shari Zippert – strings

Technical
 Bones Howe – producer, engineer
 Ed Thrasher – art direction
 Wayne Kimbell – design
 George Rodriguez – photography

References 

1968 albums
The Association albums
Warner Records albums
Albums produced by Bones Howe